Hainau may refer to:

Chojnów, Poland,  Hainau in German
Hainau, Germany, in Rhein-Lahn-Kreis, Rhineland-Palatinate
The County of Hainaut, as spelled in the oldest documents